Longman & Eagle is an American restaurant located in the Logan Square neighborhood of Chicago. It was founded in 2010.

Restaurant

History
The restaurant was founded in 2010 by Pete Toalson and Bruce Finkelman, who had previously founded the music venue the Empty Bottle together. Jared Wentworth, the restaurant's first chef, emphasized pork dishes. The restaurant also features a six room inn, which inspired food critic Alan Richman to refer to the restaurant as a "neo-flophouse".  As of 2018, Bruce Finkelman and Craig Golde, through their firm  16” on Center, own, co-own, operate, and/or co-operate several music venues, including The Empty Bottle, The Promontory, Evanston S.P.A.C.E., Sonotheque (which closed in 2009), and Thalia Hall, all in and near Chicago. Finkeleman and Golde are similarly affiliated with several other restaurants and bars, both at those music venues and free-standing, including Bite Cafe, Dusek's, and Longman & Eagle.

Cuisine
Longman & Eagle is a gastropub, focused on serving upscale versions of traditional bar fare. Early in the restaurant's history, some of its produce was sourced by Chicago-based urban forager Dave Odd; Odd has also been employed by restaurants including Browntrout and Blackbird.

In particular, Longman emphasizes meat-based dishes. The restaurant's tongue hash (beef tongue served with truffle hash) has been highlighted by several publications.

Awards and accolades
The Michelin Guide awarded the restaurant stars for seven sequential years, beginning in 2010, but it was moved to the less prestigious Bib Gourmand list in 2017.

See also
 List of Michelin starred restaurants in Chicago

External links
 Longman & Eagle site

References

Restaurants established in 2010
Restaurants in Chicago